Samsula-Spruce Creek is a census-designated place (CDP) in Volusia County, Florida, United States. The population was 5,047 at the 2010 census. While many households reside here, it is principally an agricultural area west of the cities of Port Orange and New Smyrna Beach.

Geography
Samsula-Spruce Creek is located at  (29.061389, -81.052994).

Demographics

At the 2000 census, there were 4,877 people, 1,953 households and 1,511 families residing in the CDP. The population density was 94.5/km (244.9/mi2). There were 2,203 housing units at an average density of 42.7/km (110.6/mi2). The racial makeup of the CDP was 97.13% White, 0.33% African American, 0.33% Native American, 0.82% Asian, 0.08% Pacific Islander, 0.14% from other races, and 1.17% from two or more races. Hispanic or Latino of any race were 1.76% of the population. 21.1% were of German, 17.1% English, 9.1% Irish, 7.8% American and 6.1% Italian ancestry according to Census 2000.

There were 1,953 households, of which 25.6% had children under the age of 18 living with them, 68.7% were married couples living together, 5.5% had a female householder with no husband present, and 22.6% were non-families. 16.7% of all households were made up of individuals, and 6.5% had someone living alone who was 65 years of age or older. The average household size was 2.50 and the average family size was 2.79.

19.7% of the population were under the age of 18, 5.5% from 18 to 24, 21.9% from 25 to 44, 33.9% from 45 to 64, and 19.1% who were 65 years of age or older. The median age was 46 years. For every 100 females, there were 98.1 males. For every 100 females age 18 and over, there were 97.8 males.

The median household income was $59,427 and the median family income was $68,101. Males had a median income of $40,608 versus $24,390 for females. The per capita income was $33,084.  About 4.5% of families and 5.4% of the population were below the poverty line, including 6.2% of those under age 18 and 6.7% of those age 65 or over.

References

Census-designated places in Volusia County, Florida
Census-designated places in Florida